Sam na sam is the third album by the Czech-Polish pop singer Ewa Farna, released on 9 November 2007. It is the Polish version of her first album, Měls mě vůbec rád, and is the first full-length Polish language studio album released by Farna, as the previous two contained mostly songs in Czech.

Six songs on the album are cover versions with translated lyrics, while five are original compositions.

Tracks

Personnel
 Ewa Farna − vocals
 Honza Ponocný − guitar
 Jan Lstibůrek − bass guitar
 Roman Lontadze − drums
 Daniel Hádl − keyboard instruments, programming
 David Solař − keyboard instruments, programming

External links
 Allmusic

Ewa Farna albums
2007 albums